kabel eins Doku is a free-to-air television channel owned by ProSiebenSat.1 Media. The channel is a sister station of kabel eins and went on air on 22 September 2016.  It broadcasts documentaries.

History

Programming

American Lawmen (American Lawmen - Männer des Gesetzes) (2016–present)
Bizarre Foods with Andrew Zimmern (Skurrile Kost: Kulinarische Reisen) (2016–present)
Ernest Shackleton (2017–present)
Fearless Chef (Fearless Cook) (2017–present)
For the Love of Cars (Kultautos - Aufgespürt und aufgemotzt) (2017–present)
Homicide Hunter (Homicide Hunter - Dem Mörder auf der Spur) (2017–present)
Natural World (2017–present)
Nightwatch (Notruf in New Orleans) (2017–present)
Ross Kemp on Gangs (Ross Kemp: Die gefährlichsten Gangs der Welt) (2017–present)
Secrets of America's Favorite Places (Geheimnisvolles Amerika) (2016–present)
The Curse of Oak Island (Oak Island - Fluch und Legende) (2017–present)
The FBI Files (F.B.I. - Dem Verbrechen auf der Spur) (2017–present)
The Kennedy Files (Die Kennedy-Akten) (2017–present)
The Pacific (2016)
The Profit (Der Business-Retter - Auf Erfolgskurs mit Marcus Lemonis) (2017–present)
The Silent War (Silent War - Der Kalte Krieg unter Wasser) (2017–present)
Yellowstone (2016–present)

Audience share

Germany

References

External links
 

Television stations in Germany
Television stations in Austria
German-language television stations
Television channels and stations established in 2016
2016 establishments in Germany
ProSiebenSat.1 Media
Mass media in Munich